Dying Star is the debut studio album by American Country Music singer and songwriter Ruston Kelly, released on September 7, 2018 through Rounder Records. The album was recorded at the Sonic Ranch in El Paso, Texas, and produced by Kelly and Jarrad Kritzstein.

Track listing

Personnel
Eli Beaird – bass
Greg Calibi – mastering
Ian Fitchuk – drums, organ, percussion, piano
Charles Godfrey – engineer
Matthew Glasbey – assistant
Jon Green – background vocals
Natalie Hemby – background vocals
Ruston Kelly – engineer, acoustic guitar, harmonica, producer, vocals, xylophone
Tim Kelly – pedal steel
Jarrad Kritzstein – engineer, Fender Rhodes, electric guitar, producer, background vocals
Kacey Musgraves – background vocals
Mario Ramirez – assistant
Kyle Ryan – banjo
Andrew Scheps – mixing
Abby Sevigny – background vocals
Nick Steinhardt – art direction, design
Joy Williams – background vocals
Kate York – background vocals

References

External links
Ruston Kelly
Ruston Kelly at Rounder Records

2018 debut albums
Rounder Records albums
Albums recorded at Sonic Ranch
Ruston Kelly albums